The Soldiers of Halla is the  tenth and final book in the Pendragon Adventure series by D. J. MacHale. It concludes the battle between the Travelers and Saint Dane. The title was revealed by D. J. MacHale on December 9, 2008, and was taken from a closing line in the preceding book, Raven Rise. The jacket cover was revealed on March 3, 2009; the book itself was released on May 12, 2009.

Summary
The Soldiers of Halla begins with the eleven Travelers, meeting in a crumbling wasteland of a city. They are immediately attacked by a helicopter, forcing them to seek refuge in the buildings. Bobby and Loor are trapped in a pit and watch as a colony of people are caught by the helicopters in a nearby building. When the helicopters leave, however, the Travelers gather back together. The first generation of Travelers quickly appear, such as Osa, Loor's mother, and Seegen, Kasha's father, and lead the other Travelers away. Bobby is met by his family again, who tell him that the wasteland was in fact the New York City zoo on Third Earth. His family leads Bobby to another place, that is filled with dark clouds and crumbling, dark matter. They confess that they know all that has transpired in Halla so far, including Bobby's murder of Alexander Naymeer on Second Earth. Moreover, they tell him that Solara is indeed the essence of Halla and thus the ten territories. Each victory and defeat inflicted by the Travelers and Saint Dane is reflected in the overall health of Solara. All of the souls of Halla are transferred to Solara after they pass on in Halla. The exiles that were launched into the flume are the last remaining positive spirit. The rest is the negative spirit influencing Saint Dane's evil Solara. Bobby travels to several worlds, including Third Earth, where Mark had been sent, and is leading a group of other exiles and rebels of Ravinia. Eventually, after visiting other worlds, he returns to Third Earth. He learns from Nevva that the exiles are on Eelong.  Saint Dane finds out that Nevva betrayed him, and kills her, not allowing her spirit to return to Solara.  Bobby goes to Eelong, and reaches Black Water just before the klees (cats that are the sentient species of the jungle-like territory of Eelong) are going to attack the exiles and the gars (humans that are not quite as intelligent as the klees.) The travelers defeat them and go back to Solara.  Uncle Press then proposes that they should protect the exiles as they are the only positive energy that keeps Solara running. Bobby proposes that Uncle Press's plan would only delay defeat. He thinks they should make a portal and transport the exiles to the Ravinians on Third Earth and defeat the Ravinians. The plan is successful and they take the Ravinian conclave. Bobby finds and gets into a fight with Saint Dane, and as Saint Dane uses up all of his power, he dies. As the Travelers are victorious, all of Halla is saved from a fatal disaster. After he destroys Saint Dane, Bobby and the other travelers are allowed to live the life they would have had if they weren't travelers. The readers are shown Bobby and Courtney Chetwynde in a scene mirroring their first scene in the series. However, it is shown that rather than the young teens as before, this Bobby and Courtney are much older, Bobby himself being confined to a hospital bed. They kiss as a mysterious stranger (Uncle Press Tilton) barges into Bobby's hospital room and gives Bobby a box containing a "story". This "story" is actually Bobby's Journals. The series ends with Courtney reading aloud the first journal.

Trivia
Bobby Pendragon wrote a grand total of 37 journals throughout his entire journey as a Traveler.
Mark Dimond was the keeper of all of Bobby's Journals.

References

External links

 Google Books

The Pendragon Adventure
2009 American novels
American fantasy novels